Ambika is an Indian actress known for her works predominantly across the entire the southern film industry films and in several teleserials. She also did one English film (an Indo-American one), to date. She was one of the top south Indian heroines for more than a decade from 1978 to 1989. Her younger sister Radha was also an actress. They acted together in a number of south Indian films during the peak of their careers.

Personal life
Ambika was born to Karunakaran and Sarasamma at Kallara village,(Kallara, Thiruvananthapuram) located in Thiruvananthapuram district. Her mother Kallara Sarasamma was Mahila Congress leader during 2014. She has two younger sisters, Radha and Mallika, and two younger brothers, Arjun and Suresh.

Ambika married an NRI, named Premkumar Menon in the year 1988. The couple have two sons and are settled at United States of America. However, they have got divorced in 1996. Later, she got remarried to actor Ravikanth in 2000, which also ended in a divorce in 2002. She is currently settled in Chennai along with her sons.

Career 
Ambika started her career as a child artist and later starred as heroine acting in more than 200 South Indian films. Her career as a heroine started with the Malayalam movie Seetha, which only released very late in her career. But with films such as Neelathaamara (which was made again in 2009) and Lejjavathi, she became a busy actress within a few years not only in Malayalam, but also in Tamil and Kannada. 

K. Bhagyaraj introduced Ambika in his movie Andha 7 Naatkal (1981). Ambika did many films with the leading actors of her time such as Kamal Haasan, Rajinikanth, Vijayakanth, Sathyaraj, Mammootty, Mohanlal, Dileep, Shankar, N. T. Rama Rao, Krishna, Krishnam Raju, Dr. Rajkumar, Ambareesh and Chiranjeevi.

In 1986, she acted in the superhit Malayalam movie Rajavinte Makan, which starred Mohanlal. She also acted with him the following year in another massive hit movie Irupatham Noottandu.

In Tamil, Ambika shot to fame with Kaakki Sattai (1985). At the zenith of her career she costarred with her sister Radha in Kadhal Parisu (1987), where both actresses demonstrated their acting prowess in the roles of two sisters, both with strong but conflicting personalities.

After getting divorced, she returned to India from U.S.A. Later in the year 1997, she started acting again in films Periya Manushan, opposite Sathyaraj and Simhada Mari, Maa Nannaku Pelli with Krishnam Raju. She acted in Vikraman's project Mariyadhai (2009), in which Vijayakanth played a double role of father and son. Unlike Ambika, her younger sister Radha never returned to movies after marriage and got completely engrossed with supporting her husband's business in different locations, across all Indian cities. 

She has acted in many advertisements. She is a designer too. She has judged many reality shows also. In a film called Medulla Oblangatta  (2014) she has done lyrics work too.

Filmography
In order of languages in which she acted the most to fewest films.

Malayalam

Tamil

Kannada

Telugu

Television

Serials

Shows

References

External links

 
 Ambika at MSN

Indian film actresses
Living people
Actresses from Thiruvananthapuram
Actresses in Tamil cinema
Actresses in Malayalam cinema
Actresses in Kannada cinema
20th-century Indian actresses
21st-century Indian actresses
Year of birth missing (living people)
Indian television actresses
Actresses in Malayalam television
Actresses in Tamil television
Actresses in Kannada television
Actresses in Telugu cinema
Actresses in Telugu television
Child actresses in Malayalam cinema